The 56th district of the Texas House of Representatives contains the western portion of McLennan County, and a portion of Waco. The current Representative is Charles Anderson, who was first elected in 2004.

References 

56